Jacob Tsur (1906-1991) was the first Israeli minister to Argentina, Uruguay, Paraguay, and Chile (1949-1953), and was ambassador to France from 1953 until 1956. From 1961 until 1977, he was Chairman of the Board of Directors for Kerel Kayemeth LeIsrael Jewish National Fund (KKL-JNF).

Tsur was born in Vilna to father Samuel Tchernowitz and moved to Israel in 1921.

References

External links
 German Wiki article

Ambassadors of Israel to Paraguay
Ambassadors of Israel to Argentina
Ambassadors of Israel to Uruguay
Ambassadors of Israel to France
Diplomats from Vilnius
Ambassadors of Israel to Chile
Lithuanian emigrants to Mandatory Palestine
1906 births
1991 deaths